Zi-Qiang Zhu (born September 23, 1962 in Zhejiang, China), better known Z. Q. Zhu, is a Chinese-born British professor in electrical machines and control. He is the head of the Electrical Machines and Drives Research Group at the University of Sheffield in the UK, which is one of the largest research groups consisting of more than 100 personnel, specializing in permanent magnet brushless machines and drives for applications ranging from automotive, aerospace, renewable energy, to industrial and domestic products. The group also hosts the Rolls-Royce University Technology Centre on Advanced Electrical Machines and Drives and the Sheffield Siemens Wind Power Research Centre (S2WP). Zhu is academic director of S2WP and also director of the Welling Shanghai Research Centre.

Education
He received BEng and MSc degrees in electrical and electronic engineering from Zhejiang University, in 1981 and 1984, respectively, and a PhD degree in electrical and electronic engineering from the University of Sheffield, in 1991. From 1984 to 1988, he was a lecturer with the Department of Electrical Engineering of Zhejiang University. Since 1988, he has been with the University of Sheffield, where he was initially a research associate and then subsequently appointed to an established post as senior research officer/senior research scientist. Since 2000, he has been a professor of electrical machines and control systems with the Department of Electronic and Electrical Engineering, University of Sheffield. In 2016 he became a Fellow of the Royal Academy of Engineering

Research
His research experience includes design and analysis of brushless PM, switched reluctance, induction motors, actuators, and drives; vector, direct torque, sensorless and intelligent controls; as well as noise and vibration. On these topics, he has published more than 900 journal and conference papers, including more than 300 IEEE Transactions and IET Proceedings papers. His current major research interests include design and control of permanent magnet brushless motors and drives, for applications ranging from automotive to renewable energy.

Awards and honors

 2021 - IEEE Nikola Tesla Award

References

1962 births
Living people
Chinese emigrants to the United Kingdom
British people of Chinese descent
People from Zhejiang
Scientists from Ningbo
Zhejiang University alumni
People from Cixi
Fellows of the Royal Academy of Engineering